Olayinka Sanni (born August 21, 1986) is a Nigerian-American professional basketball player. Born in Chicago Heights, Illinois, she most recently played the center / power forward position for the Phoenix Mercury in the WNBA and also for Charleville-Méz in France – LFB.

College career
In her senior year at West Virginia, Sanni averaged career highs in points per game (16.2) and rebounds per game (7.1).

WNBA career
Sanni was drafted 18th overall in the 2008 WNBA Draft by the Detroit Shock. Out of the 31 games she played in her rookie season, she started 9. She shot exactly 50% from the floor (41–82) while averaging just a little over 10 minutes per game.

She is playing for Calais in France during the 2008–09 WNBA off-season.

She is currently playing for ESB Villeneuve-d'Ascq in France during the 2009–10 WNBA off-season.

Career statistics

College
Source

WNBA

Regular season

|-
| align="left" | 2008
| align="left" | Detroit
| 31 || 9 || 10.5 || .500 || .000 || .649 || 2.1 || 0.2 || 0.4 || 0.2 || 1.3 || 3.4
|-
| align="left" | 2009
| align="left" | Detroit
| 31 || 1 || 9.6|| .480 || .000 || .694 || 1.8 || 0.5 || 0.4 || 0.2 || 1.0 || 3.8
|-
| align="left" | 2011
| align="left" | Phoenix
| 14 || 0 || 5.2 || .667 || .000 || .333 || 0.7 || 0.0 || 0.2 || 0.1 || 0.9 || 1.6
|-
| align="left" | Career
| align="left" | 
| 76 || 10 || 9.2 || .503 || .000 || .646 || 1.7 || 0.3 || 0.3 || 0.2 || 1.1 || 3.3

Playoffs

|-
| align="left" | 2008
| align="left" | Detroit
| 9 || '0 || 7.3 || .438 || – || .500 || 1.8 || 0.3 || 0.3 || 0.0 || 0.4 || 1.8
|-
| align="left" | 2009
| align="left" | Detroit
| 3 || 0 || 4.3 || .625 || – || – || 1.0 || 0.0 || 0.0 || 1.0 || 0.0 || 3.3
|-
| align="left" | Career
| align="left" | 
| 12 || 0 || 6.6 || .500 || – || .500 || 1.6 || 0.3 || 0.3 || 0.3 || 0.3 || 2.3

Philanthropy 
Olayinka Sanni oversees the Olayinka Sanni Foundation, a not-for-profit that caters to the development of boys and girls through leadership and basketball camps. In 2017, she hosted a basketball camp for teenage boys and girls in Lagos, Nigeria.

References

1986 births
Living people
African Games bronze medalists for Nigeria
African Games medalists in basketball
African Games silver medalists for Nigeria
American expatriate basketball people in France
American sportspeople of Nigerian descent
American women's basketball players
Basketball players from Illinois
Centers (basketball)
Competitors at the 2007 All-Africa Games
Detroit Shock players
Nigerian expatriate basketball people in France
Nigerian women's basketball players
People from Chicago Heights, Illinois
Phoenix Mercury players
Sportspeople from Cook County, Illinois
West Virginia Mountaineers women's basketball players
Homewood-Flossmoor High School alumni